Boyalı may refer to:

Surname
 Ayşegül Ergin Boyalı (born 1971), Turkish female Taekwondo practitioner
 Ekrem Boyalı (born 1970), Turkish Taekwondo practitioner and coach

Places
 Boyalı, Aksaray, village in Aksaray Province, Turkey
 Boyalı, Ardanuç, village in Artvin Province, Turkey
 Boyalı, Beypazarı, village in Ankara Province, Turkey
 Boyalı, Güdül, village in Ankara Province, Turkey
 Boyalı, Sinanpaşa, village in Afyonkarahisar Province, Turkey
 Boyalı, Suluova, village in Amasya Province, Turkey
 Boyalı, Yusufeli, village in Artvin Province, Turkey

See also
 Boyali, a town in Central African Republic
 Boali, a town in Central African Republic